This is a list of members of the Western Australian Legislative Council from 22 May 1912 to 21 May 1914. The chamber had 30 seats made up of ten provinces each electing three members, on a system of rotation whereby one-third of the members would retire at each biennial election.

Notes
 On 22 January 1914, North Province MLC Richard Pennefather died. Joseph Holmes won the resulting by-election on 21 March 1914 against three other Liberal candidates.
 On 21 February 1914, North-East Province MLC James Connolly resigned. Labor candidate Harry Millington won the resulting by-election on 21 March 1914, and his term was deemed to expire in May 1920.

Sources
 
 
 

Members of Western Australian parliaments by term